Pishkuh Rural District is a rural district (dehestan) in the Central District of Qaen County, South Khorasan Province, Iran. At the 2006 census, its population was 3,295, in 1,012 families.  The rural district has 6 villages.

References 

Rural Districts of South Khorasan Province
Qaen County